Charles Zeller Klauder (February 9, 1872 – October 30, 1938) was an American architect best known for his work on university buildings and campus designs, especially his Cathedral of Learning at the University of Pittsburgh, the first educational skyscraper.

Biography

Born in Philadelphia, Pennsylvania, Klauder was the son of Louis and Anna Koehler Klauder, who had immigrated to Philadelphia from Germany.  He studied architecture at the School of Industrial Art at the Pennsylvania Museum. At age 15, he entered the office of Theophilus Parsons Chandler, Jr. Beginning in 1893 he worked for prominent Philadelphia architectural firms, including Wilson Brothers & Company, Cope & Stewardson, and Horace Trumbauer. In 1900, Klauder became chief draughtsman for Frank Miles Day & Brother, which led to a 1911 partnership, and the firm's eventual renaming as Day & Klauder. Klauder continued the firm after Day's 1918 death.

Klauder teamed with the English-born Day to design some of the nation's most influential and distinguished campus buildings during the heyday of university expansion in the early 20th century. Along with Cope & Stewardson, Day & Klauder may be credited with the invention of the Collegiate Gothic idiom in American architecture. Their early work at Princeton and Cornell universities set the standard for dormitory and classroom designs in the Ivy League. Klauder extended the Gothic idiom during the 1920s to incorporate elements of Art Deco abstraction and modern building technology. He created campus plans for the University of Colorado (1917) in Boulder, St Paul's School in Concord, NH, Pennsylvania State University at University Park, and Concordia Seminary in St Louis, MO. His work at Princeton included dining halls (1913), Dickinson Hall (1929), dormitories (1921), the Holder group (1928), and the university's second library (1927).

Several of his landmark Neo-Gothic buildings at the University of Pittsburgh are the Cathedral of Learning, Heinz Memorial Chapel and the Stephen Foster Memorial. The Cathedral of Learning, upon its completion, was the tallest educational building in the world, and today it ranks behind only a tower at Moscow University. It is also listed on the National Register of Historic Places.

The Marks Scout Resource Center at 22nd and Winter Streets in Philadelphia was built in 1929. Klauder designed the building in the Beaux Arts style.

Klauder considered his greatest achievement to be the Commons Room of the Cathedral of Learning.

For his lifelong architectural work, Klauder has received the gold medal, Architectural League, N.Y. 1921; Grand Prix Pan American Congress of Architects, 1927; Architectural Medal, Olympic Games, 1928. Klauder was a Fellow of the American Institute of Architects. In 1938 he was elected into the National Academy of Design as an Associate Academician.

Klauder died aged 66 on October 30, 1938.  His remains are interred at West Laurel Hill Cemetery in Bala Cynwyd, Pennsylvania.

Notable works

Brown University

 Littlefield Hall, 1925
Hegeman Hall, 1926
 Metcalf Research Laboratory, 1938

University of Colorado Boulder

Campus master plan, 1918. 15 buildings of the University of Colorado Boulder in the Tuscan Vernacular Revival style, characterized by rough, textured sandstone walls with sloping, multi-leveled red-tiled roofs and Indiana limestone trim, were designed by Klauder between 1921 and 1939. The oldest buildings of the CU-Boulder campus, such as Old Main (1876) and Macky Auditorium (1923), are in the Collegiate Gothic style of many East Coast schools.
Norlin Library, final building designed by Klauder on the CU Boulder campus, 1939

Concordia Seminary
14 buildings including:
Martin Luther Tower

Cornell University
 Baker Hall and Baker Tower, 1913
Founders Hall
Lyon Hall, 1928
McFaddin Hall, 1928
War Memorial, 1928
Mennen Hall, 1931

Franklin and Marshall College
Dietz-Santee Dormitory
Franklin-Meyran Dormitory
Biesecker Gymnasium
Hensel Auditorium
Fackenthal Laboratories, now the Harris Center for Business, Government, and Public Policy
Central Heating Plant
Fackenthal Pool
Franklin and Marshall College Master Plan

University of Pennsylvania
Franklin Field 1922, 1925
Palestra
Hutchinson Gymnasium, 1926–1928
Coxe 1926 and Sharpe 1929 Wings of the University Museum
Alterations to Weightman Hall

University of Pittsburgh
Cathedral of Learning, 1926-1937
Heinz Memorial Chapel, 1933-1938
Stephen Foster Memorial, 1937

Princeton University
15 buildings including:
Walker Hall, 1930
Holder Hall, 1909, Day & Brother.
University Dining Halls, 1916, Day & Klauder.
Joline Hall, 1939

St. Paul's School
Central Heating Plant
Quadrangle Dorms

Pennsylvania State University
College Master Plan
Sackett Building
Buckhout and Borland Labs
Steidle Building
The Nittany Lion Inn
Additions to Pond Lab and Sparks Building
The Power Plant
Henderson Building
(New) Old Main
Rec Hall
Pattee Library
Burrowes Building
Electrical Engineering West
Osmond and Frear Labs
Ag Engineering
Ferguson Building
The Poultry Plant
Additions to Steidle and Sparks

University of Chicago
Eckhart Hall

Other academic buildings
Peabody Museum, Yale University, 1916–24.
Main Hall and Dormitory, Mercersburg Academy, 1927.
Pendleton Hall, Wellesley College, 1934.
Library, Albion College, 1937.

Non-academic buildings
First Presbyterian Church, Kalamazoo, Michigan, 1926–30.
Marks Boy Scout Resource Center, Philadelphia, 1929–30.
Mary E. Switzer Memorial Building, Washington, D.C., with Louis A. Simon, 1939.

Gallery

Bibliography

Notes

References

External links

 Charles Z. Klauder Collection at the Carnegie Mellon University Architecture Archives

1872 births
1938 deaths
Gothic Revival architects
University of the Arts (Philadelphia) alumni
American people of German descent
American architects
Olympic competitors in art competitions